Angels of Distress is funeral doom metal band Shape of Despair's second studio album. It was mastered in Finnvox by Mika Jussila. The album is packaged in a digipak and includes no booklet, though the lyrics can be viewed on the band's official website.

Track listing
 "Fallen" – 6:09
 "Angels of Distress" – 9:43
 "Quiet These Paintings Are" – 14:40
 "...To Live for My Death..." – 17:22
 "Night's Dew" – 7:00

Music and lyrics by Jarno Salomaa in 1997 and 1999.

Credits

Shape of Despair
 Jarno Salomaa - lead guitars & synth
 Tomi Ullgren - bass & rhythm guitars
 Natalie Koskinen - female vocals
 Samu Ruotsalainen - drums
 Pasi Koskinen - growled & clean vocals

Session musician
 Toni Raehalme - violin

References

2001 albums
Shape of Despair albums